This table is designed to show the role(s) performed by each chemical element, in nature and in technology.

Z = Atomic numberSym. = SymbolPer. = PeriodGr. = Group

See also
Abundance of the chemical elements
Dietary mineral

External links
The Role of Elements in Life Processes | Mineral Information Institute
Periodic Table of the Chemical Elements and Dietary Minerals
What Chemical Elements Are Found Within The Human Body? - Science - Questions & Answers
Digging for rare earths: The mines where iPhones are born | Apple - CNET News, September 26, 2012